Local elections was held in Olongapo City on May 13, 2019 in the Philippine general election. The voters will elect a Mayor, Vice Mayor, and ten Councilors.

Mayoralty Election
Incumbent Mayor, Rolen Paulino, is running for reelection in the Nacionalista Party.

His opponent is Anne Gordon, the former Vice-Governor of Zambales. Gordon is married to the former Olongapo Mayor, James "Bong" Gordon Jr. She is running under the banner of Lakas–CMD.

On November 29, 2018, Paulino withdrew his certificate of candidacy and was replaced by his son Atty. Rolen Paulino Jr. According to Mayor Paulino, his decision was due to the current suspension order and subsequent case filed against him.

Candidates

Mayor

Vice Mayor

Councilors

Team Paulino

Serbisyong may Puso

|-bgcolor=black
|colspan=25|

References

2019 Philippine local elections
Elections in Olongapo
May 2019 events in the Philippines
2019 elections in Central Luzon